Protestants are less than 1% of the population of Libya. There are peaceful relations between Christians and Muslims. It is prohibited to proselytize Muslims. Religious literature is restricted. Hundreds of African migrant Protestants attend services in Tripoli. Christian communities consist almost exclusively of sub-Saharan migrants. The government limited the number of places of worship allowed for each Christian denomination to one per city. There is no Bible in Libyan Arabic.

Denominations
Baptist Church in Tripoli
Coptic Evangelical Church
Seventh-day Adventist Church
Union Church of Tripoli
Tripoli Bible Church
Source of the list: The World Christian Encyclopedia, Second edition, Volume 1, p. 457

Pentecostal worship in Libya
There are Protestant worship groups in places like Tripoli and Misrata. These churches are primarily worship groups who gather together every Friday. These groups are led by Pentecostal pastors. Though these worship places are not officially approved by the government, these groups assemble together without any problems. The churches mentioned below are known places of Pentecostal worship:
Indian Prayer Fellowship, Tripoli
Global Faith Fellowship, Misrata.

See also
Protestantism by country

References

Libya
Christianity in Libya